Jesús David Murillo Largacha (born 18 February 1994) is a Colombian professional footballer who plays as a defender for Major League Soccer club Los Angeles FC.

Career
Born in Cali, Colombia, Murillo began his career with Categoría Primera A club Independiente Medellín, making his professional debut on 13 April 2012 in the Copa Colombia against Atlético Nacional. He started and played whole first half before being substituted as Independiente Medellín were defeated 2–1. A year later, Murillo moved to Deportivo Pasto and made his league debut on 4 August 2013 against Patriotas Boyacá. He was a starter in the 1–1 draw.

In 2015, Murillo joined Patriotas Boyacá and made his debut on 7 February 2015 against Millonarios. He was a starter as Patriotas were defeated 2–0. On 6 April 2017, Murillo made his international club debut in the Copa Sudamericana against Everton. He then scored his first professional goal on 3 August 2017 in a Copa Colombia match against Unión Magdalena. His 80th minute goal was enough to give Patriotas a 1–0 victory.

In 2018, Murillo left Patriotas Boyacá and re-joined Independiente Medellín, making his debut on 3 February 2018 against Atlético Huila. His scored his first goal for the club in his second match on February 11 against Boyacá Chicó in a 2–1 victory. A year later, on 7 February 2019, Murillo made his debut in the Copa Libertadores against Palestino. On 13 February, during the return leg, Murillo scored the equalizer against Palestino that would eventually lead to penalties which Independiente lost 4–1.

In November 2019, Murillo started in both matches for Independiente Medellín against Deportivo Cali in the finals of the 2019 Copa Colombia. Medellín won the title 4–3 in aggregate, drawing the first leg 2–2 and then winning the second leg 2–1.

On 14 October 2020, Murillo joined Major League Soccer club Los Angeles FC on loan for the remainder of the 2020 season. On 22 January 2021, Murillo signed with Los Angeles FC on a permanent transfer from Independiente Medellín.

Career statistics

Club

Honours
Independiente Medellín
 Copa Colombia: 2019

Los Angeles FC
MLS Cup: 2022
Supporters' Shield: 2022

Individual
 CONCACAF Champions League Team of the tournament: 2020
 MLS All-Star: 2021

References

External links
 at the Independiente Medellín website

1994 births
Living people
Sportspeople from Cali
Colombian footballers
Association football defenders
Independiente Medellín footballers
Deportivo Pasto footballers
Patriotas Boyacá footballers
Los Angeles FC players
Categoría Primera A players
Major League Soccer players